Melvin Pender Jr. (born October 31, 1937 in Atlanta, Georgia) competed as a runner in the 1964 and 1968 Olympics, winning an Olympic gold medalist in the 4x100 m relay at the 1968 Summer Olympics.  He had been a member of the Philadelphia Pioneer Track Club where he was coached by Alex Woodley, who had coached several other athletes who went on to participate in Olympic events.

U.S. Army career
Pender enlisted in the U.S. Army at age 17. In 1960 he was assigned to the 82nd Airborne Division on Okinawa. Following the 1964 Tokyo Olympics, he returned to military service, graduating from Officer Candidate School in 1965. He was subsequently deployed to South Vietnam where he served with the 9th Infantry Division in the Mekong Delta. Subsequently he was ordered to return to the U.S. to train for 1968 Olympics in Mexico City.

After the 1968 Olympics, Pender returned to South Vietnam where he earned a Bronze Star Medal. Returning to the U.S. in August 1970, he then worked as assistant track and field coach and then as head track coach at the United States Military Academy at West Point. He later earned a bachelor's degree from Adelphi University. He retired from the Army in 1976 with the rank of Captain.

Olympic athlete
While serving in the U.S. Army his incredible speed was noticed in camp football games. He was selected to the 1964 Olympic Team, but was hampered by injury and finished seventh in the 100 meters at Tokyo.

Nearing age 31, Pender again made it to the 100 m final, where his explosive start and exceptional acceleration brought him to the lead midway through the race, but he faded slightly and finished sixth. In the relay, he was chosen to run the second leg. The American team won the gold medal in a new world record of  He also set world records in the 50 yds at 5.0, 60 yds at 5.8, 70 yds at 6.8 and 100 meters at 9.9 seconds.

References

External links
Runners Gazette – Soldier-Athlete Mel Pender, Olympic Gold Medalist
Adelphi University – Mel Pender ’76, ’97 (Hon.), continues to go for the gold

1937 births
Living people
Track and field athletes from Atlanta
American male sprinters
African-American male track and field athletes
Athletes (track and field) at the 1964 Summer Olympics
Athletes (track and field) at the 1968 Summer Olympics
Olympic gold medalists for the United States in track and field
Medalists at the 1968 Summer Olympics
United States Army officers
United States Army personnel of the Vietnam War
Adelphi University alumni
20th-century African-American sportspeople
21st-century African-American people